Xs on Your Eyes is the fourth album by +/-, released in late October 2008. An instrumental version of the song "sweet home Alabama" was used as menu loop background music in the band's 2007 Self Titled Debut Digital Video Disc DVD release. A music video for the song "Snowblind", directed by Nancy Mitchell, was released on 29 October 2008. The track "The Hours You Keep" appears as background music in Series 1 Episode 9 of Crash.

Track listing
 "Tired Eyes"
 "Snowblind"
 "Subdued"
 "The Queen of Nothing"
 "Halos"
 "Unsung"
 "The Hours You Keep"
 "Marina"
 "You'll Catch Your Death"
 "Xs on Your Eyes"
 "Flight Data Recorder"
 "Reeling in the Years" (Bonus track on Japanese release)

References

External links
Page for the album at & Records (in Japanese)
+/- official discography
Video for Snowblind

2008 albums
+/- (band) albums